António Maurício Farinha Henriques Morato (born 6 November 1964) is a Portuguese retired footballer who played as a central defender.

Club career
Relatively short for the position, Lisbon-born Morato quickly imposed himself at local Sporting CP, being an undisputed starter from the age of 19 onwards and making nearly 200 competitive appearances for the capital club before he reached 25. During his spell, he formed a pair of youth graduate stoppers alongside Pedro Venâncio.

Morato then moved to another Primeira Liga side in the summer of 1989, FC Porto, but his one-year stay would be not very successful: he won the only championship in his career but only appeared twice, barred by, amongst others, Belgian international Stéphane Demol.

Morato finished his professional career at only 29, after spells with C.F. Os Belenenses, Gil Vicente F.C. (two years) and G.D. Estoril Praia.

International career
Morato earned six caps for Portugal, being picked for the squad at the 1986 FIFA World Cup where he was an unused substitute.

Personal life
Morato's father, also named António, was also an international footballer.

Honours
Sporting CP
Supertaça Cândido de Oliveira: 1987

Porto
Primeira Liga: 1989–90

References

External links

1964 births
Living people
Portuguese footballers
Footballers from Lisbon
Association football defenders
Primeira Liga players
Segunda Divisão players
Sporting CP footballers
FC Porto players
C.F. Os Belenenses players
Gil Vicente F.C. players
G.D. Estoril Praia players
C.D. Beja players
Portugal youth international footballers
Portugal under-21 international footballers
Portugal international footballers
1986 FIFA World Cup players